These are the official results of the Women's 100 metres Hurdles event at the 1991 IAAF World Championships in Tokyo, Japan. There were a total number of 33 participating athletes, with two semi-finals and five qualifying heats and the final held on Friday August 30, 1991.

Medalists

Final

Semi-finals
Held on Thursday 1991-08-29

Qualifying heats
Held on Thursday 1991-08-29

See also
 1988 Women's Olympic 100m Hurdles (Seoul)
 1990 European World Championships 100m Hurdles (Split)
 1992 Women's Olympic 100m Hurdles (Barcelona)
 1994 European World Championships 100m Hurdles (Helsinki)

References
 100 Metres Hurdles women 3rd IAAF World Championships in Athletics. IAAF. Retrieved 2019-08-09.
 Results

H
Sprint hurdles at the World Athletics Championships
1991 in women's athletics